Rutilus meidingeri is a species of freshwater fish in the family Cyprinidae. It is only found in three subalpine lakes in Austria and probably in few lakes of Slovakia. Since the 1980s, it has been extirpated from the German Lake Chiemsee and Austrian Traunsee.

Rutilus meidingeri is distinguished from other roaches in the genus Rutilus by its almost cylindrical body. The snout is rounded and stout, and mouth in a subterminal position. The eyes and fins are grey or slightly yellowish. Breeding males have large, scattered tubercles on top and side of their head. Locally the species is known as the Perlfisch. 

R. meidingeri is a relatively large cyprinid, specimens up to 70 cm length have been reported. It feeds on benthic invertebrates, and breeds in shallow nearshore areas of the inflowing streams of its native lakes.

References

meidingerii
Fish described in 1851
Taxobox binomials not recognized by IUCN